The 2017 Bahrain–Merida Pro Cycling season was the first season of the  team, which was founded in 2016. As a UCI WorldTeam, they were automatically invited and obligated to send a squad to every event in the UCI World Tour, and their season began in January with the Tour Down Under.

Team roster

Riders who joined the team for the 2017 season

Riders who joined the team for the 2017 season

Season victories

National, Continental and World champions 2017

Footnotes

References

External links
 

2017 road cycling season by team
Team Bahrain Victorious
2017 in Bahraini sport